Jonathan Adagogo Green (1873-1905) was according to some sources the first professional photographer in what is now Nigeria to have ethnic origins in that area. He is significant in being a pioneering  photographer in what is now Nigeria, noted for his documentation of the colonial power and local culture, particularly his Ibani Ijo community.

Green was born in Bonny, present day Rivers State. “He studied photography in Sierra Leone and then established a studio in Bonny.” The area where he lived became part of the British Oil Rivers protectorate in 1884, which was renamed to the Niger Coast Protectorate in 1893. It was part of the Southern Nigeria Protectorate for the last few years of Green's life, starting in 1900.

Green was active as a photographer for only a short lifetime, dying at the age of 32.
“But during this period he was both energetically productive and remarkably adroit in serving both indigenous and colonial clienteles.”
“When he set up shop his work was appreciated and rewarded by two very different communities.” His "strategic use of initials on his business cards and stamps... disguised his African origins", part of his working with the colonial era officials.

References

Further reading
 Anderson, Martha G. and Lisa Aronson, eds. 2017. African Photographer J. A. Green: Reimagining the Indigenous and the Colonial. Bloomington: Indiana University Press. 400 pages.  (hard cover).
 Anderson, Martha G. and Lisa Aronson. 2011. "Jonathan A. Green: An African Photographer Hiding in Plain Sight". African Arts 44(3):38-49.

Photographers
1873 births
1905 deaths
People from the Kingdom of Bonny
People from the Niger Coast Protectorate